Ophélia is a 1963 French film directed by Claude Chabrol. Its story mirrors that of Shakespeare's Hamlet.

Plot
Yvan's father has recently died and his mother, Claudia, marries her husband's brother, Adrien. Yvan refuses to accept the new marriage and descends into a fantasy world where he believes that his mother and his uncle are responsible for the death of his father. Then Adrien suddenly dies and Yvan learns his uncle's true identity.

Cast
Alida Valli as Claudia Lesurf
Claude Cerval as Adrien Lesurf
André Jocelyn as Yvan Lesurf
Juliette Mayniel as Lucie
Robert Burnier as Andre Lagrange
Jean-Louis Maury as Sparkos
Sacha Briquet as Gravedigger

References

Sources

Further reading

External links

French drama films
Films directed by Claude Chabrol
Modern adaptations of works by William Shakespeare
Films based on Hamlet
1963 films
Films set in France
Films with screenplays by Paul Gégauff
1960s French films